The Summer Cup is an Australian Turf Club Group 3 Thoroughbred horse race held as a quality handicap for horses three years old and older and run over a distance of 2000 metres at Randwick Racecourse, Sydney, Australia in late December. Total prize money for the race is A$160,000. The race was first run in 1890.

History

Distance
 1890–1952 - 1 miles  (~2600 metres)
 1953–1971 - 1 miles  (~2400 metres)
 1972–2012 – 2400 metres
 2013 onwards - 2000 metres

Grade
 1890–1978 - Principal Race
 1979 onwards - Group 3

Venue
 2011, 2012 - Rosehill Racecourse

Winners

 2021 - Parry Sound
 2020 - Spirit Ridge
2019 - Luvaluva
2018 - Fierce Impact
2017 - Montauk
2016 - Red Excitement
2015 - Mighty Lucky
2014 - I'm Imposing
2013 - I'm Imposing
2012 - Le Roi
2011 - Yulalona
2010 - Spechenka
2009 - Solid Billing
2008 - Ready To Lift
2007 - †race not held 
2006 - Jamberoo
2005 - Aqua D'Amore
2004 - This Manshood
2003 - Stadium
2002 - Stoway
2001 - Majestically
2000 - Lanolin
1999 - Zanetta
1998 - Dance Til Dawn
1997 - Linesman
1996 - Century Boy
1995 - Catalan Prince
1994 - Spiritual Star
1993 - Striking Gold
1992 - Mr. Eurostar
1991 - Cross Swords
1990 - Magnolia Hall
1989 - Lord Hybrow
1988 - Super Impose
1987 - Perfect Jet
1986 - Limitless
1985 - Britt's Kingdom
1984 - Rising Prince
1983 - Our Shout
1982 - Just For Tristram
1981 - Port Carling
1980 - Peninsula
1979 - Azranee
1978 - Dear John
1977 - Princely Sum
1976 - Ming Dynasty
1975 - On Your Mark
1974 - Kasharyl
1973 - Rangoon
1972 - Big Butch
1971 - Dark Diamond
1970 - Royal Entrance
1969 - Regal Jane
1968 - Sandy's Hope
1967 - Duo
1966 - Royal Display
1965 - Flotsam
1964 - Hyde
1963 - General Delivery
1962 - Alspick
1961 - Kamikaze
1960 - Dual Copy
1959 - Nadar Shah
1958 - Compass
1957 - Half Hennesy
1956 - Baystone
1955 - Viteren
1954 - Pipe On
1953 - Double Blank
1952 - Carioca
1951 - Persist
1950 - Ballroom
1949 - Snowstream
1948 - Regal Son
1947 - Silent
1946 - Haxton
1945 - Invictus
1944 - Easter Time
1943 - Cream Puff
1942 - Amberspear
1941 - Santa
1940 - Malagigi
1939 - Bringa
1938 - Red Sails
1937 - Young Crusader
1936 - Sir Ross
1935 - Vice Royal
1934 - Dark Chief
1933 - Nord
1932 - ‡Pretzel/Miss Nottava
1931 - Vertigern
1930 - Dalston
1929 - Donald
1928 - Donald
1927 - Vitality
1926 - Strongbow
1925 - Dainty Davie
1924 - Prince Minimbah
1923 - King Of The Forest
1922 - Oranian
1921 - King Of The Forest
1920 - Braille
1919 - Pah King
1918 - Arch Marella
1917 - Poitrel
1916 - The Fortune Hunter
1915 - Foil
1914 - Lochano
1913 - Barlow
1912 - Alured
1911 - Baw Bee
1910 - Britain
1909 - Ungarie
1908 - Epos
1907 - Vanadium
1906 - Tatterdemalion
1905 - Ossian
1904 - Cato
1903 - Bridegroom
1902 - Aurantia
1901 - Caledonia
1900 - Blue Metal
1899 - Blue Metal
1898 - Strathroy
1897 - Tornado
1896 - Damien
1895 - Mahee
1894 - Blarney Stone
1893 - Jeweller
1892 - Little Bernie
1891 - Vespasia
1890 - Stockwell 

† Not held because of outbreak of equine influenza
‡ Dead heat

See also
 List of Australian Group races
 Group races

References

Horse races in Australia